Mell-O-Tones is an Australian swing band directed by Phillip Sametz. They play music from 1920s to the 1940s. Their album with the Don Burrows, Non Stop Flight - Great Music Of The Swing Era, was nominated for the 2006 ARIA Award for Best Jazz Album.

Discography

Albums

Awards and nominations

ARIA Music Awards
The ARIA Music Awards is an annual awards ceremony that recognises excellence, innovation, and achievement across all genres of Australian music. They commenced in 1987. 

! 
|-
| 2006
| Non-Stop Flight: Great Music Of The Swing Era (with Don Burrows)
| Best Jazz Album
| 
| 
|-

References

Australian musical groups